Dorrery is a small hamlet lying to the east of Ben Dorrery  in the district of Halkirk in Caithness, Scottish Highlands and is in the Scottish council area of Highland.

Ca na Catanach is a medieval road that stretches between Dorrery Lodge and Achentoul.

References

Populated places in Caithness